Dasygaster is a genus of moths of the family Noctuidae.

Species
 Dasygaster atrata Turner, 1931
 Dasygaster cremnodes Lower, 1893
 Dasygaster dictyota (Lower, 1902)
 Dasygaster epipolia Turner, 1920
 Dasygaster epundoides Guenée, 1852
 Dasygaster eudmeta Turner, 1939
 Dasygaster ligniplena (Walker, 1857)
 Dasygaster melambaphes Turner, 1925
 Dasygaster obumbrata (Lucas, 1894)
 Dasygaster oressigenes Turner, 1925
 Dasygaster padockina (Le Guillou, 1841)
 Dasygaster pammacha Turner, 1922
 Dasygaster punctosa (Walker, [1857])

References
 Dasygaster at Markku Savela's Lepidoptera and Some Other Life Forms
 Natural History Museum Lepidoptera genus database

Hadeninae